The Abingdon Company is a watch and aviation products manufacturer founded in Oregon in 2007 by Chelsea Abingdon Welch. The company manufactures what it describes as the first aviation watch specifically designed for women.

History
The Abingdon Co. began during a round table dinner conversation between a mix of women pilots and airplane mechanics. Pilot and company founder Chelsea Abingdon Welch listened as her colleagues repeatedly expressed their desires for a fully functional aviator's watch that was "fashionable, versatile and, most importantly, made for women".  Abingdon first spent over 11 months designing two models—the Jackie and the Amelia—and then launched the company on November 3, 2007.

The Abingdon Co. also manufactures travel and dive watches, with various features:

 The Amelia features an E6B flight calculator and Zulu time (quartz movement)
 The Jackie features an E6B flight calculator and a chronograph and the outer case back has over 64 twinkling zirconia rivets (quartz movement)
 The Katherine features an ATIS bezel and a chronograph (quartz movement)
 The Elise features a tri-time zone (quartz movement)
 The Marina is a fully automatic dive watch with a world timer, wet suit expander band as well as a silicone band, titanium band, and a diver's outer bezel.

References

External links
 Official Website

Watch brands
Companies based in Las Vegas